Conor Henry (born 30 July 1970) is an Irish former cyclist. He competed in the individual road race at the 1992 Summer Olympics. In the same year, he also won the Milk Race.

References

External links
 

1970 births
Living people
Irish male cyclists
Olympic cyclists of Ireland
Cyclists at the 1992 Summer Olympics
Place of birth missing (living people)